Luceria  is a genus of moths of the family Erebidae. It was described by Francis Walker in 1859.
This genus is found in southern Asia, Australia, on several Pacific islands and a few species also in Africa.

Taxonomy
The genus has previously been classified in subfamily Strepsimaninae of the family Noctuidae.

Species
 Luceria albipupillata Holloway, 2008
 Luceria bakeri Holloway, 2008
 Luceria cooki Holloway, 1977
 Luceria emarginata D. S. Fletcher, 1961
 Luceria eurhipoides (Hampson, 1891)
 Luceria fletcheri Inoue, 1958
 Luceria icasta D. S. Fletcher, 1957
 Luceria jowettorum Holloway, 1982
 Luceria nigerrinalis (Fryer, 1912)
 Luceria novatusalis Walker, 1859
 Luceria oculalis (Moore, 1877)
 Luceria opiusalis Walker, 1859
 Luceria pallida (Hampson, 1891)
 Luceria pamphaea D. S. Fletcher, 1961
 Luceria striata Galsworthy, 1997

References

 
 
 
 Walker (1859). List of the Specimens of Lepidopterous Insects in the Collection of the British Museum 19: 853-854

Hypenodinae
Moth genera